Lal Bahadur Rawal is a member of 2nd Nepalese Constituent Assembly. He won Bajhang–2 seat in CA assembly, 2013 from Communist Party of Nepal (Unified Marxist–Leninist).

References

1963 births
Living people
People from Bajhang District
Communist Party of Nepal (Unified Marxist–Leninist) politicians
Members of the 2nd Nepalese Constituent Assembly